José Leonardo Navarro Galíndez (1915–2000) was a Mexican football forward who played for Mexico in the 1950 FIFA World Cup. He also played for Atlante.

References

1915 births
2000 deaths
Mexican footballers
Mexico international footballers
Association football forwards
Atlante F.C. footballers
1950 FIFA World Cup players